Wonder Raps is a British educational children's television series, broadcast on Sky and streaming platforms. Presented by MC Grammar, he is a teacher who uses educational rap to teach children.

Each animated episode is 5 minutes long, with each featuring a different educational rap about a given topic. Topics in the first season included volcanoes and how to save the planet. The premise of the show is to teach children in a fun way about topics that some children would struggle to focus on.

Background
In 2019, Jacob Mitchell from the London Borough of Barnet began to use social media to post educational raps. This began when he posted a video rapping The Gruffalo to his daughter. Mitchell began to use the performing name "MC Grammar," featuring on numerous TV and radio shows, including The Ellen Show.

Broadcast
In October 2021, it was announced that Sky Kids would air the first season of the show.

References

2021 British television series debuts